The 1935 All-Ireland Minor Football Championship was the seventh staging of the All-Ireland Minor Football Championship, the Gaelic Athletic Association's premier inter-county Gaelic football tournament for boys under the age of 18.

Tipperary entered the championship as defending champions.

On 22 September 1935, Mayo won the championship following a 1-6 to 1-1 defeat of Tipperary in the All-Ireland final. This was their first All-Ireland title.

Results

Connacht Minor Football Championship

Leinster Minor Football Championship

Ulster Minor Football Championship

Munster Minor Football Championship

All-Ireland Minor Football Championship

Semi-Finals

Final

Championship statistics

Miscellaneous

 In the Ulster final, Down defeated Donegal by 2-2 to 2-1, however, an objection to the result was launched by the Donegal County Board. A counter objection was later launched by the Down County Board before the Ulster Council declared the championship null and void. Donegal were later nominated to represent Ulster in the All-Ireland semi-final.

References

1935
All-Ireland Minor Football Championship